Shtulim (lit. Planted) is a moshav in south-central Israel. Located near Ashdod, it falls under the jurisdiction of Be'er Tuvia Regional Council.

History
The moshav was founded in 1950 by Jewish refugees from Yemen, with the name taken from a passage in the Book of Psalms 92:13: "They are planted in the house of the Lord, they flourish in the courts of our God."

Shtulim was built  the land of the  Palestinian village of Isdud, which was depopulated in 1948.

It has been flooded multiple times due to its proximity to two rivers.

References

Moshavim
Populated places established in 1950
Populated places in Southern District (Israel)
Yemeni-Jewish culture in Israel
1950 establishments in Israel